Eline Thorp Steffensen (born 6 September 1993) is a Norwegian singer and songwriter from Hamarøy, Nordland. She received national attention when she was titled this week's Urørt in 2011. The same year she played at festivals like by:Larm, Hove Festival, Slottsfjell Festival and the Bukta Festival.

Career 
In 2013, she released her first single, "The Game," along with a corresponding music video. In 2014, her debut album, Mirror's Edge, was released on the label Beyond Records. The album received very good reviews, and received dice five from Stein Østbø reviewer.

In 28 January 2023, Thorp participated in the third semi-final of Melodi Grand Prix 2023 with the song "Not Meant To Be". She advanced to the final round on February 4, and placed sixth.

Discography

Solo albums

Singles

References

External links 
 

1993 births
Norwegian songwriters
21st-century Norwegian women singers
21st-century Norwegian singers
Living people